Beaufin is a commune in the Isère department in the Auvergne-Rhône-Alpes region of south-eastern France.

The inhabitants of the commune are known as Beaufinois or Beaufinoises.

Geography

Beaufin is located some 50 km south by south-east of Grenoble and 25 km north by north-west of Gap. Access to the commune is by the D217 road from Ambel in the north-west which continues east across the river to join the Route nationale N85. The D57L from Le Glaizil in the south-east also passes through the commune and across the river without connecting to the road to the village. The only access to the village is by the D217A which branches off the D217 in the commune and is a dead-end road due to the collapse of a tunnel on the road leading south. The commune has three well-defined areas: in the west and south are the slopes of Mount Faraud with bare rock in the higher parts (over 1600 metres) and forests in their lower part; in the centre is a cultivated plain where the village is located; in the north and east the wooded slopes descend towards the river Drac.

The Drac forms the northern and eastern border of the commune with the upper reaches of the artificial Lac du Sautet to the north of the commune. The Drac is also the departmental boundary with Hautes-Alpes until the south-eastern corner of the commune where the departmental border becomes the southern border of the commune. One small stream flows north from Mount Faraud, through the village and into Lake Sautet.

Toponymy
Beaufin appears as Baufin on the 1750 Cassini Map and as Bausin on the 1790 version.

Administration

List of Successive Mayors

Demography
In 2017 the commune had 20 inhabitants.

Sites and Monuments

 A Church from the 19th century with a unique nave, some marble in the interior (the altar, a foot stoup, a baptismal font)
 Remains of a castle from the early 15th century
 Red Rock lava flows.

See also
Communes of the Isère department

References

Communes of Isère